With its debut in 1993, the Pacific Symphony Youth Orchestra (PSYO) became the first educational program of Pacific Symphony and is now one of four youth orchestras in the Pacific Symphony Youth Ensembles (PSYE) program.  Pacific Symphony Youth Orchestra gives an opportunity to young, talented musicians in the Orange County and Inland Empire areas to grow and be trained as orchestral musicians.  Composed of youth in grades 9 through 12, members of PSYO are given the opportunity to work with the professional musicians of Pacific Symphony and are led by Jacob Sustaita, Assistant Conductor of Pacific Symphony.  PSYO currently performs its annual concert series in the Renée and Henry Segerstrom Concert Hall at the Segerstrom Center for the Arts.

Music Directors 
2015–Present : Roger Kalia
2012-2015 : Alejandro Gutierrez
2008-2012: Maxim Eshkenazy
2002-2008: Michael Hall

Repertoire

2019-2020 season
"Three Cornered Hat", Falla
"Danzon No. 2", Marquez
"Young Person's Guide to an Orchestra", Britten
"Estancia", Ginastera
"Luminosity", Rogerson
"Symphony No. 5", Shostakovich
"Symphony No. 8", Beethoven
"Flute Concerto", Ibert
"Violin Concerto No. 5", Viewuxtemps
"Pines of Rome", Resphigi

2018-2019 season
"On the Waterfront: Symphonic Suite", Bernstein
"The Planets", Holst
"Appalachian Springs for Small Ensemble", Copland
"Symphony No.2", Rachmaninoff
"Concertino for Trombone", David
"Cello Concerto in B minor", Dvorak
"Rite of Spring", Stravinsky

2017-2018 season
"Roman Carnival Overture", Berlioz
"Journey Suite", Wintory
"Firebird Suite (1919)", Stravinsky
"Analog Intelligence", Faegre
"Symphony No.1 (Titan), Mahler
"Violin Concerto in A minor", Glazunov
"Violin Concerto in D minor", Sibelius
"American in Paris", Gershwin

2016-2017 season
"Ruslan and Ludmila Overture", Glinka
"Selection from Porgy and Bess", Gershwin
"Symphony No.3 (Organ)", Saint-Saens
"Overture to Die Meistersinger", Wagner
"Billy the Kid Suite", Copland
"Church Windows", Respighi
"Poem for Flute and Orchestra", Griffes
"Violin Concerto", Tchaikovsky
"Symphony No.2 I. Allegro Maestoso", Mahler

2015-2016 season
"Finlandia", Sibelius 
"Carmen Suite", Bizet 
"Pictures at an Exhibition", Mussorgsky
" Mars and Jupiter from The Planets", Holst
"Imperial March from Star Wars Suite", Williams 
"Symphonic Dances from West Side Story", Bernstein 
"Suite from Der Rosenkavalier", Strauss 
"Bacchanale from Samson and Delilah", Saint-Saens 
"Symphony No. 4", Tchaikovsky

2014-2015 season 
"Candide Overture", Bernstein
"Swan Lake Suite", Tchaikovsky
"Pines of Rome", Respighi 
"Russian Easter Overture", Rimsky-Korsakov
"Main Theme and Imperial March from Star Wars Suite", Williams
"Superman", Williams
"Symphony No.8", Dvorak
"Saint-Saens Violin Concerto"
"Dvorak Cello Concerto"
"David"
"Tarentella", Bottesini
"Symphony No.5", Shostakovich

2013-2014 season 
"4 Norwegian Dances", Grieg
"La Forza del Destino Overture", Verdi
"Symphony No.3 (Organ)", Tchaikovsky
"Inner Sanctum and the Egg Travels", Newton Howard
"Jurassic Park", Williams
"Romeo and Juliet Suites 1 and 2", Prokofiev
"Tuning Up", Varese
"Suite Estancia", Ginastera
"Symphony No. 5", Tchaikovsky
"Fantasie Brilliante", Borne
"Cello Concerto No.2", Haydn
"Symphonie Espagnole", Lalo
"Tuba Concerto in F Minor", Vaughan Williams

2008-2009 season 
"Capriccio Espagnol", Rimsky-Korsakov
"Andante Cantabile for Strings", Tchaikovsky
"Snow Dance", Przytulski
"Hary Janos Suite", Kodály
"Symphonic Dances from West Side Story", Bernstein
"Polovtsian Dances from the Opera Prince Igor", Borodin
Symphony No.1: "Titan", Gustav Mahler

2007-2008 season 
"Finlandia", Sibelius
"Serenade for Winds", Strauss
"Scheherazade", Rimsky-Korsakov
Sympnony No. 2: "Totenfeier", Gustav Mahler
"Tzigane", Ravel
"Symphony No. 5", Beethoven
"Festive Overture", Dimitri Shostakovich
"Radiant Voices", Frank Ticheli
"Swan Lake Suite", Tchaikovsky

References

External links
Website
Renée and Henry Segerstrom Concert Hall

American youth orchestras
1993 establishments in California
Musical groups established in 1993
Youth organizations based in California
Orchestras based in California